Grant W. Johnson (August 30, 1903 – June 7, 1965) was an American politician who served in the New York State Assembly from the Essex district from 1952 to 1965.

He died of a heart attack on June 7, 1965, in Albany, New York at age 61.

References

1903 births
1965 deaths
People from Ticonderoga, New York
Republican Party members of the New York State Assembly
20th-century American politicians